Nothing Without You is a 1991 studio album by the jazz singers Mel Tormé and Cleo Laine.

Track listing 
 "I'm Nothing Without You" (Cy Coleman, David Zippel) – 3:04
 "I Thought About You" (Johnny Mercer, Jimmy Van Heusen) – 3:51
 "Where or When" (Lorenz Hart, Richard Rodgers) – 5:09
 "I Wish I Were in Love Again" (Hart, Rodgers) – 3:11
 "Girl Talk" (Neal Hefti, Bobby Troup) – 5:09
 "After You've Gone" (Henry Creamer, Turner Layton) – 4:44
 "Brazil"/"Bahia" (Ary Barroso)/(Sidney Keith Russell) – 4:19
 "Birdsong" (Sambalaya) (Johnny Dankworth) – 2:53
 "Isn't It a Pity?" (George Gershwin, Ira Gershwin) – 4:04
 "Love You Madly" (Duke Ellington) – 3:34
 "Angel Eyes" (Earl Brent, Matt Dennis) – 4:34
 "Two Tune Medley" (Tormé, Laine) – 4:52
 "I Don't Think I'll Fall in Love Today" (George Gershwin, Ira Gershwin) – 3:45
 "Ev'ry Time We Say Goodbye" (Cole Porter) – 2:55

Personnel 
 Cleo Laine - vocals
 Mel Tormé

References 

1991 albums
Cleo Laine albums
Mel Tormé albums
Albums produced by Carl Jefferson
Concord Records albums
Vocal duet albums